King Nabhi or Nabhi Rai was the 14th or the last Kulakara of avasarpini (the descending half of the cosmic time cycle in Jainism and the one in which the world is said to be at present). He was the father of Rishabhanatha, the first tirthankara (founder of Jainism) of present avasarpini. According to Jain text Ādi purāṇa, Nabhirāja lived for 1 crore purva and his height was 525 dhanusha (long bows).

According to Jain literature, India was known as Nābhivarṣa (land of Nabhi) before being renamed as Bhāratavarṣa after Bharata, the son of Rishabhanatha.

Life 
King Nabhi or Nabhi Rai was the fourteenth or the last Kulakara of avasarpini. He taught the men how to cut the nabhi (navel chords) and organised them into social polity. Marudevi, queen of king Nabhi, saw the 14 auspicious dreams. When she shared her dreams with the king, he explained that she will give birth to a tirthankara. She then gave birth to Rishabhanatha, the first tirthankara of present avasarpini. According to Jain text Ādi purāṇa, Nabhirāja lived for 1 crore purva and his height was 525 dhanusha (long bows). Nabhi is depicted as one of the Manus in Bhagavata Purana. He is shown as the great-grandson of Svayambhuva, the first Manu.

According to Jain literature, India was known as Nābhivarṣa (land of Nabhi) before being renamed as Bhāratavarṣa after Bharata, the son of Rishabhanatha.

See also

 Salakapurusa

Notes

References

Citations

Sources
 
 
 
 
 
 
 

Solar dynasty
Jain giants
Rishabhanatha